Animal Crossing Plaza is a discontinued free to play social networking service developed and published by Nintendo for the Wii U. A spin-off of Animal Crossing: New Leaf of the Animal Crossing series, Plaza was released as a tie-in to Miiverse, Nintendo's now-defunct social networking service. The application is no longer actively supported by Nintendo, and was removed from the Nintendo eShop on December 22, 2014.

Gameplay
Animal Crossing Plaza allowed users to interact with other players of the Nintendo 3DS game Animal Crossing: New Leaf. The application was similar to Nintendo's Wara Wara Plaza, and allowed users to post messages for other players, receive news and updates about New Leaf, and participate in polls. The game connected with New Leaf via SD card, allowing players to post and archive New Leaf screenshots, and share in-game clothing designs using QR codes. Users could also upload Plaza posts directly to Nintendo's Miiverse social networking service. The game's overworld was populated by non-player characters from the Animal Crossing series, who users could interact with.

Development
Animal Crossing Plaza was announced in a Nintendo Direct on August 7, 2013, and was released digitally on the Nintendo eShop that same day. Plaza was planned as a limited-time application, with Nintendo stating in its announcement of the application that it would only be supported through the end of 2014.

On December 8, 2014, Nintendo released a statement confirming that it would cease ongoing support for Plaza. The application was removed from the Nintendo eShop on December 22, 2014, and the ability to create new posts within the application was removed on December 31, 2014. Plaza remains accessible to users who downloaded the application prior to its removal from eShop, though its social features are no longer usable.

References

External links
 Official English website
 Official Japanese website

2013 video games
Animal Crossing video games
Wii U-only games
Wii U games
Nintendo Entertainment Analysis and Development games
Nintendo Network games
Wii U eShop games
Video games developed in Japan
Social simulation video games
Video game spin-offs
Delisted digital-only games